Agassi Yeshe Goantara (born October 17, 1999) is an Indonesian professional basketball player for Stapac Jakarta of the Indonesian Basketball League. He represented Indonesia national basketball team for the 2018 Asian Games 3X3. Currently, Agassi is attending University of La Verne of NCAA Division 3 and is a member of their basketball team.

Early career 
Agassi was born and raised in Tangerang, a city located in the west outskirt of Jakarta. He moved to the United States in 2015 during his sophomore year of high school. He attended Walnut High School in Walnut, California and was a member of their varsity basketball team during his three year tenure. During his sophomore year, Agassi did not get much playing time as he finished the year averaging 2.9 points, 1.6 rebounds and 0.3 assist. He improved vastly during his junior year and led his team in scoring with 16 points per game while shooting 45 percent. Agassi again improved during his senior year as he led Walnut High to the semi-final of the Glendora Basketball Tournament. He was eventually named the tournament MVP as his team finished third after beating the host team, Glendora High School where Agassi scored 22 points. For the year, he averaged 18.8 points, 5.5 rebounds and 1.2 assists.

College career

Freshman Year (2018-19)

Professional career

Stapac Jakarta (2018-present)

Rookie of the Year (2018-19)

National team 
Agassi was called to represent Indonesia during 2018 Asian Games 3x3 Basketball where he and his team finished third on their pool which consisted of teams from China, Thailand, Indonesia, Sri Lanka and Vietnam. They unfortunately were not qualified to proceed to the knockout stage. He was called to join the national team for the 2021 FIBA Eastern Region Pre-Qualifiers where he and his team successfully secured a spot at FIBA Asia Cup 2021 Qualifiers which is scheduled to be held in November 2019.

IBL Career statistics

Regular season

Playoffs

References

https://www.antaranews.com/berita/755407/stapac-proyeksikan-agassi-goantara-gantikan-prastawa

Living people
1999 births
Indonesian men's basketball players
Shooting guards
Small forwards
Basketball players at the 2018 Asian Games
Asian Games competitors for Indonesia
People from Tangerang
Sportspeople from Banten
Competitors at the 2021 Southeast Asian Games
Southeast Asian Games gold medalists for Indonesia
Southeast Asian Games medalists in basketball